Álvaro Alonso Rubio (born ) is a Spanish male  track cyclist, and part of the national team. He competed in the team sprint event at the 2007 and 2009 UCI Track Cycling World Championships.

References

External links
 Profile at cyclingarchives.com

1985 births
Living people
Spanish track cyclists
Spanish male cyclists
Place of birth missing (living people)